This list is drawn from the Universities and Colleges Christian Fellowship (UCCF) website. It is not necessarily exhaustive, nor are all the Christian Unions shown necessarily affiliated to UCCF.

England

East Central
Amersham & Wycombe College
Anglia Ruskin University, Cambridge
Anglia Ruskin University, Chelmsford
Bedford College
University of Bedfordshire
Brunel University, Uxbridge – CU Website
Buckinghamshire New University, High Wycombe – CU Website
Buckinghamshire New University, Newland Park – CU Website
Cambridge Regional College
University of Cambridge (Cambridge Inter-Collegiate Christian Union) – CU Website
City College Norwich
Colchester Institute
Cranfield University, Cranfield
De Montfort University, Bedford
Downham Market High School – Sixth Form Centre
University of East Anglia – Norwich CU Website
University of Essex – CU Website
The Henley College
Hertford Regional College, Ware Centre
University of Hertfordshire – CU Website
University of East Anglia – CU website
Norwich University of the Arts
Oaklands College, Welwyn Garden City
Oxford Brookes University
Oxford Institute of Legal Practice
University of Oxford (Oxford Inter-Collegiate Christian Union) – CU Website
Suffolk College, Ipswich – CU Website
West Suffolk College
Westminster Institute, Oxford Brookes University
Writtle College

London

 Goldsmiths, University of London – CU Website
 Heythrop College (Ecumenical Christian Union)
 Imperial College London – CU Website
 Roehampton University
 King's College London – CU Website
 King's College School of Medicine and Dentistry – CU Website
 Kingston University – CU Website
 University College London – CU Website
 University College London Medical School – CM Website
 London School of Economics – CU Website
 London Southbank University
 Queen Mary, University of London – CU Website
 Royal College of Art – CU Website
 Royal College of Music
 Royal Holloway, University of London – CU Website
 School of Oriental and African Studies – CU Website
 St Paul's School (London) – CU Website
 St. Mary's University College (Twickenham)
 University of East London
 University of West London (formerly Thames Valley University)

Midlands
 Aston University
 Bishop Grosseteste University, Lincoln
 Birmingham City University – CU Website
 Coventry University – CU Website
 University of Derby - CU Facebook Page
 Keele University – CU website
 University of Leicester - CU Website
 Loughborough University – CU Website
 University of Lincoln – CU Website
 University of Nottingham – CU Website
 University of Nottingham (Sutton Bonington) —CU Website
 University of Warwick – CU Website
 University of Birmingham – CU Website
 Nottingham Trent University (City) – CU Website
 Nottingham Trent University (Clifton)
 University of Northampton – CU Website
 University of Staffordshire – CU Website - Stoke Campus and CU Website - Stafford Campus

North East
Barnsley College
Bishop Burton College
Bradford College
University of Bradford – CU Website
Bretton Hall College, University of Leeds
Calderdale College
Cleveland College of Art and Design, Hartlepool
Cleveland College of Art and Design, Middlesbrough
The College of Law, York
Darlington College of Technology
Dearne Valley College
Dewsbury College
Durham University (Durham Inter-Collegiate Christian Union) CU Website
Durham University#Queen's Campus – Stockton on Tees – CU Website; Evangelistic Sermons at QCCU
Gilesgate Sixth Form College
Greenhead College
Grimsby College
Huddersfield New College
University of Huddersfield – CU Website
University of Hull – CU Website
University of Hull, Scarborough
Leeds College of Technology
University of Leeds - CU Website
Leeds Metropolitan University – CU Website
University of Lincoln, Hull
Newcastle College
Newcastle University – CU Website
North Lindsey College
Northumbria University, Newcastle – CU Website
Park Lane College
Sheffield Hallam University – CU Website
University of Sheffield – CU Website
Stockton Sixth Form College
University of Sunderland – CU Website
University of Teesside – CU Website
Trinity and All Saints College, University of Leeds
York College
York St John University – CU Website
University of York – CU Website

North West
 Lancaster University – CU website
 Liverpool Universities (University of Liverpool, Liverpool John Moores University, Liverpool Hope University) – CU website 
 Manchester Metropolitan University – CU website
 University of Central Lancashire – CU website
 University of Cumbria (Lancaster campus) – CU website
 University of Cumbria (Carlisle campus) – CU website
 University of Manchester – CU website
 University of Salford – CU website
 University of Chester – CU website

South East
 Solent University – CU website
 University of Brighton – CU website
 University of Kent – CU website
 University of Portsmouth – CU website
 University of Reading – CU website
 University of Winchester – CU website
 University of Southampton – CU website
 University of Surrey – CU website
 University of Sussex – CU website
 University of Chichester 
 Chichester College
 Eastbourne College
 Bournemouth University/Arts University Bournemouth – CU website
 Royal Grammar School, Guildford - CU website

South West
 University of Bath – CU website
 University of Bristol – CU website
 University of Exeter – CU website 
 University of Gloucestershire – CU website
 Plymouth University – CU website
 University of the West of England – CU website
 Falmouth University/University of Exeter, Cornwall Campus – CU website
 University of St Mark & St John (Plymouth)

Northern Ireland

Belfast

Methodist College Belfast
Queen's University Belfast – CU website

Scotland
 Glasgow Caledonian University - CU website
 Glasgow School of Art - CU Facebook Page
 Heriot-Watt University – CU website
 Herriot-Watt Scottish Borders Campus – CU Facebook Page
 Napier University – CU website
 Queen Margaret University - CU Website
 Robert Gordon University – CU website
 Royal Conservatoire of Scotland - CU Facebook Page
 Sabhal Mòr Ostaig - CU Facebook Page
 University of Aberdeen – CU website
 University of Abertay Dundee – CU website
 University of Dundee – CU website
 University of Edinburgh – CU website
 University of Glasgow – CU website
 University of St Andrews – CU website
 University of Stirling – CU website
 University of Strathclyde – CU website
 University of the Highlands and Islands - CU Facebook Page
 University of the West of Scotland - CU Facebook Page

Wales

Aberystwyth University – CU Website
Bangor University – CU Website
Cardiff University – CU Website
Cardiff Metropolitan University
University of Glamorgan – CU Website
University of Wales, Newport
Swansea University – CU Website

References

Christian student societies in the United Kingdom
Christian Unions in Great Britain
Christian
Christian
Christian Unions